Muhammad Shahrom bin Abdul Kalam (born 15 September 1985) is a retired Malaysian footballer. He plays mainly as a centre-back but can also play as a right-back.

Club career

Early career
Shahrom began his football career with under the strong guidance and encouragement of his parents and family, Abdul Kalam Suhaimi and Shariah Abdul Wahid and his 3 siblings. It was Shahrom's mother who first realised that Shahrom's intense passion to play football seriously when he was 7. Shahrom's mother acted as his unofficial coach, trainer and manager during his early days of playing football and he has never looked back since then. His mother who also managed and coached the rag tag street football team that Shahrom and a couple of his childhood friends were in.

Shahrom played all through his years in primary school years developing and polishing his talents. During his early secondary school years, Shahrom was recruited in Kuala Lumpur Football Academy which was based at the Cheras Football Stadium. His stint with Kuala Lumpur Football Academy opened many doors for Shahrom to polish his skills and talent on the field which ultimately resulted in him being recruited to join the illustrious Bukit Jalil Sports School.

Kuala Lumpur, Shahzan Muda
Shahrom began his football career playing for Kuala Lumpur youth team before been promoted into the first team in 2005. Shahrom played for Malaysia Premier League side Shahzan Muda for 2007-08 season before returning to Kuala Lumpur in 2009.

In December 2011, Shahrom signed a contract with Perak.

Selangor F.C. 

Shahrom joined Selangor F.C. in the 2014 Malaysia Super League after his contract was terminated by Perak. He was immediately named captain by Mehmet Durakovic. In 2015, he led his team to the final match of the 2015 Malaysia Cup after defeating Pahang 2–0 in the Shah Alam Stadium. And later to clinch the cup by beating Kedah in final with 2–0 in the same venue.

Perak
On 19 December 2016, Shahrom rejoins Perak for a second stint. He made his Malaysia Super League debut for Perak in a 1–1 draw against Pahang in Perak Stadium.

Felcra
On 29 December 2017, Shahrom signed a contract with Malaysia Premier League club Felcra.  Shahrom played the role of Captain and during his stint rallied to elevate Felcra  as one of the best team in Malaysian Premier League 2018 thus qualifying Felcra for Malaysia Super League 2019. Felcra did not have the chance to prove their mettle in Malaysia Super League since the club was disbanded after even after they qualified to move from Malaysia Premier League to the Super League.

International career
He made his debut for Malaysia national football team, when he enters the friendly match against Hong Kong as a substitute, on 3 June 2011.

Career statistics

Club

International

Honours

Club
Selangor
 Malaysia Cup: 2015

References

External links
 
 

1985 births
Living people
Malaysian footballers
Malaysia international footballers
Perak F.C. players
Kuala Lumpur City F.C. players
Selangor FA players
Negeri Sembilan FA players
Sportspeople from Kuala Lumpur
Association football defenders
Malaysian people of Malay descent